Mary Fisher (born April 6, 1948) is an American political activist, artist and author. After contracting HIV from her second husband, she has become an outspoken HIV/AIDS-activist for the prevention, education and for the compassionate treatment of people with HIV and AIDS. Fisher is particularly noted for speeches before two Republican Conventions: Houston in 1992 and San Diego in 1996. The 1992 speech has been hailed as “one of the best American speeches of the 20th Century”.

She is the founder of a non-profit organization to fund HIV/AIDS research and education, the Mary Fisher Clinical AIDS Research and Education (CARE) Fund. Since May 2006, she has been a global emissary for the Joint United Nations Programme on HIV/AIDS (UNAIDS).

Early life
Fisher was born Lizabeth Davis Frehling on April 6, 1948, in Louisville, Kentucky, the daughter of Marjorie Faith (née Switow) and George Allen Frehling. Her parents were of Russian Jewish descent. Her parents divorced when she was four, and the following year her mother married multimillionaire Max Fisher, who adopted her and whose surname she took.

Raised in Michigan, Fisher attended Kingswood School (today's Cranbrook Kingswood School) in Bloomfield Hills (where she had briefly dated politician Mitt Romney), and attended college at the University of Michigan for a year before taking a volunteer position at ABC television in Detroit, Michigan, which she left when afforded an opportunity to join the staff of Gerald R. Ford, then President of the United States, as the first female "advance man".

In 1977, Fisher entered her first marriage, which soon dissolved. In 1984, she sought treatment at the Betty Ford Center for alcoholism; while there, she realized she was artistically inclined. After rehabilitation, she resettled to New York City, New York, and in 1987 she married fellow artist Brian Campbell. The couple relocated to Boca Raton, Florida, and expanded their family. Fisher gave birth to son Max and after several miscarriages, adopted a second son, Zachary, with her husband. In 1990, Campbell requested a divorce and in 1991 informed Fisher that he was HIV positive. Fisher soon learned that she had contracted the virus from him, although their children tested negative.

Activist
Fisher decided to be open about her HIV status, and after the Detroit Free Press published her story in February 1992, she was invited to speak at the 1992 Republican National Convention in Houston, Texas. There, she urged the Republican Party to handle the AIDS crisis and those living with HIV with compassion. In 1995, The New York Times credited Fisher, along with Elizabeth Glaser, who spoke on her experience with AIDS at the 1992 Democratic National Convention, with having "brought AIDS home to America." Fisher's Republican convention speech was listed as #50 in American Rhetoric's Top 100 Speeches of the 20th Century (listed by rank). After that appearance, Fisher created a support group for families affected by AIDS and healthcare workers, the Family AIDS Network, and continued speaking as its representative, promoting education, prevention and acceptance of those with AIDS. In October 1992, President George Bush appointed her to the National Commission on AIDS to replace Magic Johnson. Fisher spoke again at the 1996 Republican National Convention in San Diego, California. Fisher did not return for the 2000 Republican National Convention in Philadelphia, Pennsylvania; she was replaced by fellow AIDS activist (and "abstinence-only" proponent) Patricia Funderburk Ware.

In 1999, Fisher made news when she, like some other HIV-positive people, decided to stop taking anti-HIV medications which she felt were hurting her quality of life.

But she and her doctors continued to try new drug combinations and, by 2001, were able to suppress the virus without unmanageable side effects. Finding medications that could prolong healthy life marked a turning point, Fisher said in a 2007 More magazine interview: "For years it was waiting to die, and then it was turning everything around and trying to figure out how to live."

Fisher expanded her AIDS activism from public speaking into writing, art and international advocacy. She founded the non-profit Mary Fisher CARE Fund, based at the Center for AIDS Research at the University of Alabama at Birmingham, to support clinical AIDS research and promote public education about HIV/AIDS medicine and policy. She serves on the leadership council of the 'Global Coalition on Women and AIDS and with other HIV-positive women has toured the United States to raise awareness about the disease.

Fisher's international work has focused on Africa and especially Zambia, where she has led fact-finding tours and has promoted income-generation projects to employ HIV-positive women. She has taught African women to create handmade jewelry which is then sold online and in U.S. galleries, with profits returned to the women artisans.

Art and design
Fisher's art has been exhibited in public and private collections around the world. Collectors include: President and Mrs. George H. W. Bush, President and Mrs. Gerald Ford, Mrs. Henry Ford II, President and Mrs. Mwanawasa of Zambia, and many others. Seven of her sculptures are displayed at the Geneva, Switzerland, headquarters of UNAIDS, as part of Art for AIDS, a collection created to recognize the role art has played in the response to AIDS. Fisher's work also has been shown at the Gerald R. Ford Presidential Library and Museum.

Fisher is represented year round by Goldenstein Gallery. Uptown Sedona, Arizona. A special show featuring her work is held annually in November. The show is titled: CHI: Art as a Healing Medium. The opening reception is held the first Friday in November. Fisher speaks in the gallery at least once a year.

She is active with the Sedona Visual Artists Coalition.

Author
Fisher is the author of six books: An autobiography called My Name is Mary: A Memoir; Angels in Our Midst, a photographic tribute to AIDS caregivers; ABATAKA, a collection of her 'AIDS-themed and African-influenced arts works; two books containing transcripts of speeches, Sleep With the Angels and I'll Not Go Quietly and in 2012, Messenger: A Self-Portrait (Greenleaf Book Group, Austin, Texas).

Since 2020, Mary has been publishing personal essays on the subjects of society, ethics, and politics on Medium.

References

External links
 MaryFisher.com, Fisher's official website
 
 American Rhetoric – clips and transcript of Fisher's 1992 RNC speech

1948 births
20th-century American women writers
20th-century American non-fiction writers
21st-century American women writers
HIV/AIDS activists
People with HIV/AIDS
American adoptees
American activists
American women artists
American people of Russian-Jewish descent
Living people
University of Michigan alumni
Writers from Louisville, Kentucky
Artists from Louisville, Kentucky
Michigan Republicans
New York (state) Republicans
Florida Republicans
Kentucky women artists
American women non-fiction writers
21st-century American non-fiction writers